Biskupová is a village and municipality in the Topoľčany District of the Nitra Region, Slovakia. In 2011 the village had 220 inhabitants.

See also
 List of municipalities and towns in Slovakia

References

Genealogical resources

The records for genealogical research are available at the state archive "Statny Archiv in Bratislava, Nitra, Slovakia"

 Roman Catholic church records (births/marriages/deaths): 1823-1897 (parish B)

External links
Official homepage
Surnames of living people in Biskupova

Villages and municipalities in Topoľčany District